During the 2005–06 Swiss football season, FC Thun competed in the Swiss Super League.

Season summary
Thun defeated Dynamo Kyiv and Malmö to reach the Champions League group stage for the first (and, as of 2012, only) time in their history, where they were drawn in Group B with English giants Arsenal, four-time winners Ajax of the Netherlands and Czech champions Sparta Prague. Thun finished third and were knocked out of the Champions League, although there was consolation as they were demoted to the third round UEFA Cup, their first appearance in Europe's secondary cup competition. The European adventure couldn't last though, as they were knocked out by German giants Hamburg.

Players

First-team squad
Squad at end of season

Left club during season

Results

Champions League

Second qualifying round

Third qualifying round

Group stage

UEFA Cup

Round of 32

Notes

References

FC Thun seasons
Thun